Bernardino Fenier (also Bernardino Venerio) (died 1535) was a Roman Catholic prelate who served as Bishop of Chioggia (1487–1535).

Biography
On 24 January 1487, Bernardino Fenier was appointed during the papacy of Innocent VIII as Bishop of Chioggia. In April 1487, he was consecrated bishop by Antonio Ursi, Bishop of Canea. He served as Bishop of Chioggia until his death in 1535.

While bishop, he was the principal co-consecrator of Luigi Contarini, Patriarch of Venice (1508).

References

External links and additional sources
 (for Chronology of Bishops) 
 (for Chronology of Bishops) 

16th-century Italian Roman Catholic bishops
15th-century Roman Catholic bishops in the Republic of Venice
Bishops appointed by Pope Innocent VIII
1535 deaths